Carlos Ramírez Ulloa (November 6, 1903 – December 22, 1980) was a Mexican civil engineer.

Ramírez was born in Guadalajara, Jalisco.
 

On December 18, 1937, he married Esther Otero Gonzalez, and they had six sons together: Jorge, Carlos, Sergio, Javier, Mario, and Oscar Ramirez Otero.
 
In this 16 years of work he completed or started the construction of 37 hydroelectric dams, 13 thermoelectric plants and one geothermic power plant. These projects consolidated the provisioning of energy to power all of Mexico, allowing economic growth through improvement in irrigation, industrial and residential systems.

He led the nationalization of the electrical companies of Chapala, Morelia, Uruapan, Tlaxcala, Moncolva, Occidental, and others, serving on their boards of directors.

These included the Miguel Alemán Dam on the Tonto River, upstream from Temascal, Oaxaca.
 
From 1959 to 1980 he participated in several companies including , focusing on projects for drinking water, irrigation, hydrolectric power, geohydrology, pollution control, and economic planning.

 
During the tribute, a request was made to honour Ramírez by having his remains reinterred at the Rotunda of Illustrious Persons within the Panteón de Dolores cemetery. The president approved the arrangement on July 12, and the remains were moved there on August 14, 2011.

Two institutions bear his name in recognition to his life achievements:
 The dam known as El Caracol "Ing. Carlos Ramírez Ulloa"
 Escuela Secundaria Tecnica No. 39 "Ing. Carlos Ramírez Ulloa" since 1983

References
 Jose Rogelio Alvarez (1988). "Ramirez Ulloa Carlos" Enciclopedia de México, Mexico TOMO XII.
 Eduardo Langange O. (1998). Pensamiento y Obra de los Ingenieros Civiles Mexicanos, TOMO II, pp. 10―20., Mexico.

1903 births
1980 deaths
Mexican civil engineers
People from Guadalajara, Jalisco